One Step More and You Die is an album by Mono, released in 2002 on the Arena Rock Recording Co. label. It received generally positive reviews, and met a larger audience than their debut album had.

Track list

Personnel
Mono
 Takaakira "Taka" Goto – lead guitar, string arrangements
 Yoda (Hideki Suematsu) – rhythm guitar
 Tamaki Kunishi – bass
 Yasunori Takada – drums

Additional musicians
 Shouko Oki – violin
 Noriko Shibuta – violin
 Keiko Shiga – viola
 Udai Shika – cello, string arrangements

Technical
 Masataka Saito – engineer, mixer
 Yuki Koizumi – masterer

References

2003 albums
Mono (Japanese band) albums
Arena Rock Recording Company albums